The women's competition in the lightweight (58 kg) division was held on 7 November 2011.

Schedule

Medalists

Records

Results

References

(Pages 33, 34 & 35) Start List 
2011 IWF World Championships Results Book Pages 14–16 
Results

2011 World Weightlifting Championships
World